Mistaria jumbo, synonym Agelena jumbo, is a species of spider in the family Agelenidae, which contains at least 1,350 species . It was first described by Embrik Strand in 1913 as Agelena jumbo. It is native to the Democratic Republic of the Congo and Rwanda.

References

Agelenidae
Spiders of Africa
Spiders described in 1913